Odorico Raynaldi or Rinaldi (1595 – 22 January 1671) was an Italian historian and Oratorian. He is also known as Odericus Raynaldus, or just Raynald.

Biography 
Raynaldi was born at Treviso of a patrician family. He studied at Parma and Padua, joined the Oratorians in Rome, and, distinguished for his piety, beneficence and scholarship, was twice elected superior-general of his congregation. He was entrusted with the continuation of the Annales Ecclesiastici of Baronius. After the publication of the first volume, he was offered the direction of the Vatican library by Innocent X, an honour which he declined. He died at Rome.

His continuation of Baronius extends from 1198 to 1565 and was published at Rome, 1646-77. He was the ablest continuator of the great historian. Although his work is marred here and there by inaccurate chronological data and lack of criticism, the numerous original documents which it reproduces render it very valuable. Raynaldi also published excerpts in Latin and Italian both from the work of Baronius and his own continuation of it.

References

External links 
 

1595 births
1671 deaths
17th-century Italian historians
Oratorians
Historians of the Catholic Church